Mike Martin (August 3, 1940–July 2002) was a Canadian football player who played for the BC Lions. He won the Grey Cup with them in 1964. He played college football at Washington State University.

References

1940 births
2002 deaths
BC Lions players
Washington State Cougars football players